Gwendolyn Veronica Green (born June 9, 1959) is an American politician. She is a member of the Pennsylvania House of Representatives representing the 190th District since 2023 and previously in 2020.

Early life and education
Green was born on June 9, 1959. She graduated from Murrell Dobbins Vocational High School in 1977 and later attended George Meany Labor College.

Political career
In February 2020, Green won a special election to fill the seat of Pennsylvania State Representative Movita Johnson-Harrell, who had pled guilty to charity theft in 2019. Green failed to win the 2020 general primary election, and was defeated by fellow Democrat Amen Brown. In 2022, Brown was redistricted to the 10th District. Green ran for the 190th seat again and won.

Electoral history

References

1959 births
21st-century African-American women
21st-century African-American politicians
21st-century American politicians
21st-century American women politicians
African-American women in politics
Living people
Democratic Party members of the Pennsylvania House of Representatives
Politicians from Philadelphia
Women state legislators in Pennsylvania